The Hochschule Wismar, University of Applied Sciences: Technology, Business and Design (or short: University of Wismar), is the third-biggest and third-oldest public university in Mecklenburg-Vorpommern, Germany. The university was founded in 1908 as an engineering academy and has become an important part in the city's cultural life.

Academics
Since 2007 the university has been restructured and has now 3 faculties reflecting the three subjects in its name: technology, business and design:
Faculty of Engineering (Mechanical, Process and Environmental Engineering, Civil Engineering, Electronics and Multimedia Engineering, Maritime Studies)
Faculty of Business (Business Administration, Business Law, Business Informatics) also called Wismar Business School
Faculty of Design (Design, Architecture, Interior Architecture, Communication Design)

The university offers more than 50 courses, including distance learning courses via its subsidiary WINGS-university. Some courses in Maritime Studies are offered in cooperation with the European Cruise Academy. Most courses lead to a bachelor's degree after 3-3.5 years or a master's degree after another 1.5–2 years. Students with a master's degree (5 years of study) qualify for pursuing a PhD.

International Cooperations 
The University of Wismar collaborates with 141 partner universities from 45 countries, including:

 Northern Business School, Hamburg 
 AIDA Cruises, European Cruise Academy, Rostock 
 Deutsche Gesellschaft für Internationale Zusammenarbeit (GIZ), Bonn 
 University of Szczecin 
 Cape Peninsula University of Technology, Cape Town
 Institut Teknologi Sepuluh Nopember, Surabaya, Indonesia 
 European Centre for Engineering and Business Education (ECEBE) 
 Dept. of Electronic & Computer Engineering of the University of Limerick (Limerick, Ireland)
 School of Computing and Mathematical Sciences of the John Moores University (Liverpool, England)
 Tokyo University of Science (Tokyo, Japan)
 Gujarat Technological University (Ahmedabad, India)
 Centre for Management and Information Technology (CMIT) (Hyderabad, India)
 Södertörns Högskola (Stockholm, Sweden)

See also

 Education in Germany
 List of universities in Germany

References

External links

 Hochschule Wismar official website
 WINGS-university
 Student Service

 
Wismar
Buildings and structures in Nordwestmecklenburg
Universities and colleges in Mecklenburg-Western Pomerania
Universities of Applied Sciences in Germany